Palamu may refer to:

 Palamu division, a division of Jharkhand state, India
 Palamu district, a district in Palamu division
 Palamu Fort, forts in the forests of the Palamau Tiger Reserve 
 Palamu (Lok Sabha constituency) a parliamentary constituency in Palamu district
 Palamu national park 
 Palamu Tiger Reserve

See also
 Palamuru, alternate name for Mahbubnagar, a city in Andhra Pradesh
 Palamuru University, a university in Mahabubnagar, Andhra Pradesh
 Palamulla, a village in Rapla County, Estonia
 Palamuse, a small borough in Jõgeva County, Estonia
 Palamuse Parish, a rural municipality of Estonia
 Palamut (disambiguation)